The velvet scoter (Melanitta fusca), also called a velvet duck, is a large sea duck, which breeds over the far north of Europe and the Palearctic west of the Yenisey basin. The genus name is derived from Ancient Greek melas "black" and netta "duck". The species name is from the Latin fuscus "dusky brown".

A small, isolated population nests in eastern Turkey. Stejneger's scoter and the white-winged scoter are sometimes considered conspecific with the velvet scoter, and its two constituent subspecies are then known as M. f. stejnegeri and M. f. deglandi. Velvet, Stejneger's, and white-winged scoter, along with the surf scoter, are placed in the subgenus Melanitta, distinct from the subgenus Oidemia, black scoter and common scoters.

It winters farther south in temperate zones, Europe as far south as Great Britain, and on the Black and Caspian Sea. Small numbers reach France and northern Spain. It forms large flocks on suitable coastal waters. These are tightly packed, and the birds tend to take off together. The species is listed as Vulnerable by the IUCN.

The lined nest is built on the ground close to the sea, lakes or rivers, in woodland or tundra, and typically contains 7–9 eggs. This duck dives for crustaceans and molluscs.

It is characterised by its bulky shape and large bill. It is the largest scoter at 51–58 cm. The male is all black, except for white around the eye and a white speculum. It has a bulbous yellow bill with a black base. The females are brown birds with two pale patches on each side of the head and white wing patches.

The velvet scoter is one of the species to which the Agreement on the Conservation of African-Eurasian Migratory Waterbirds (AEWA) applies.

References

External links

Velvet Scoter, RSPB

velvet scoter
Birds of Scandinavia
Birds of Russia
Birds of Georgia (country)
Birds of Azerbaijan
velvet scoter
velvet scoter